The Pasadena Jewish Temple & Center (PJTC) is a synagogue and community center affiliated with Conservative Judaism, located in Pasadena, California.

History

Controversies
 In 2008, tensions arose  over Israel and the Sabeel conference at All Saints Episcopal Church (Pasadena, California)

Affiliates
PJTC hosts several organizations (e.g. USY and the Weizmann Day School) on its campus, and act as an incubator for the development of Jewish leadership for the wider Pasadena Jewish community.

References
 The Story of PJTC. Gene Fingerhut, PhD.

Notes

External links
Pasadena Jewish Temple & Center

Conservative synagogues in California
Mission Revival architecture in California
Mission Revival synagogues
Buildings and structures in Pasadena, California
Religious buildings and structures in Los Angeles County, California
Culture of Pasadena, California